Jonny Phillips may refer to:
Jonny Phillips (actor) (1963), English actor
Jonny Phillips (musician) (1971), English musician